Nicki Niels Bille Nielsen (born 7 February 1988) is a Danish former professional footballer who played as a forward.

He has played for various Danish national youth teams, including 17 games and 8 goals for the Denmark national under-21 football team.

Club career
Bille Nielsen started his senior career with Danish 1st Division club BK Frem. He was promoted to the first-team in the summer 2005, and made his debut on 31 July 2005 against Fremad Amager. He signed a two-year contract with Frem in October 2005, and was on trial with English club Newcastle United in November 2005, and also had a trial with Portsmouth F.C. Though he never secured himself in the Frem starting line-up, Bille played a total 38 senior games and scored four goals for the club until August 2006.

In September 2006, he moved abroad to play for Italian club Reggina Calcio in the Serie A championship, under manager Walter Mazzarri. He scored in his debut game for Reggina, a Coppa Italia game on 8 November. He got his Serie A debut on 19 November, and played seven games during the 2006–07 Serie A season without scoring any goals. He also played for Reggina's youth team, helping them advance in the 2007 Campionato Nazionale Primavera by scoring two goals in two games against A.C. Milan Primavera. Under new manager Massimo Ficcadenti, Bille had a difficult time securing a place in the starting eleven, and he underwent loan deals with Serie C1 teams A.C. Martina and A.S. Lucchese-Libertas. Both clubs went bankrupt during his stays, and according to his agent Bille did not get his wage from Reggina either. In August 2008, Bille agreed to rescind all claims of the wages owed to him, in order for his contract to be terminated a year before its expiration. He brought with him an eight match-day suspension incurred following a red card for laying his hand on the referee in a May 2008 youth team game for Lucchese.

He moved back to Denmark, and trained with Danish Superliga team FC Nordsjælland in August 2008. On 18 September the Danish Football Association ruled that in order to help him re-establish his career, Bille's eight-day suspension would expire from the ninth match day of the 2008–09 Danish Superliga season even though he had not been signed by any club, making him available for selection from the start of October. He signed a contract with Nordsjælland on 25 September, and made his debut in October. He played 10 games in his first season with Nordsjælland, as he was backup for Martin Bernburg. As Bernburg was sold, Bille got his breakthrough in the 2009–10 Danish Superliga season, when he played 32 of 33 games and scored eight goals. He was also a part of the Nordsjælland team which won the 2010 Danish Cup.
Nicki Bille gained his first team debut 5 February 2011 in a home fixture against Levante FC, Villarreal CF lost the game 0–1. He was loaned out to Rayo Vallecano for the 2012–2013 La Liga season.

On 3 January 2013 he signed a four-year deal with Norwegian side Rosenborg after ending his stay at Rayo Vallecano earlier than planned. Billie Nielsen changed from number 9 to his favorite number 14 before the 2014 season.

In 2014, Rosenborg sold Nielsen for an undisclosed amount to the French club Evian Thonon Gaillard F.C. During his Rosenborg career, he had scored 24 goals in 50 games.

On 1 July 2015, he signed a three-year contract with Esbjerg fB, but his time at Esbjerg was never a success. He left half a year after signing with the club having played 19 games and scored five goals.

On 27 January 2016, he signed a 2.5-year contract with an option of one additional year with Polish champion Lech Poznań. He was given shirt number 19 after the former topscorer Kasper Hämäläinen. Bille got an injury in February 2016 in a match against Podbeskidzie Bielsko-Biała, where he only played 25 minutes before leaving the pitch. He was out for 1 month .

In August 2016, Bille suffered an injury in his groin that kept him out for the next seven months.
On 30 January 2018, Panionios F.C. officially announced the purchase of experienced Danish international striker Nicki Niels Bille Nielsen from Lech Poznań, for an undisclosed fee.

In July 2018 he signed a contract with Lyngby Boldklub, who was managed by Bille's former youth coach Mark Strudal. On 26 October 2018 he was sacked from Lyngby following an episode, where he was arrested and charged by the Copenhagen Police Department.

On 25 July 2019, Bille joined Ishøj IF in the Denmark Series – the 4th tier of Danish football. He was released without making an appearance, on 20 November 2019. In June 2020 he joined VB 1968 in the Zealand Series, the 5th tier of Danish football. At VB 1968 he joined several other former professional footballers such as Martin Albrechtsen, Quincy Antipas and Nabil Aslam.

International career
Bille got his international debut for the Denmark national under-18 football team in September 2005, and played four games for the team until February 2006. He was called up for the Danish under-20 national team for the 2006 Milk Cup in August, as a replacement for the injured Nicklas Pedersen, and scored one goal in two games at the tournament. From September 2006 to June 2007, he scored three goals in nine matches for the Danish U19 team. He was again included in the U20 squad for the 2007 Milk Cup, scoring one goal in three games.

After his loan to Martina, he was called-up for the Denmark national under-21 football team to replace the injured Bo Storm, and made his under-21 debut in September 2007. He was not called up again before he moved to FC Nordsjælland. In November 2008, Bille played his sixth and last under-20 international game. He rejoined the under-21 team in January 2009, and established himself in the team. In May 2010, he joined the under-21 team for a series of unofficial games at the international 2010 Toulon Tournament. He scored five goals in four appearances, becoming the top scorer of the tournament and helping Denmark finish runners-up.

International goal
Scores and results list Denmark's goal tally first.

Personal life
Bille Nielsen's cousin is Daniel Wass.

In the early hours of 27 September 2013, Nielsen was arrested by Norwegian police in Trondheim after a series of incidents at two pubs.

On 8 July 2014, Nielsen was charged by Danish authorities with committing violence against police officers during an incident in Copenhagen during Easter 2014 when he was approached by police after allegedly conducting acts of vandalism. The charges led to Rosenborg banning Nielsen from several days of training. Nielsen denied all charges by the Danish authorities.

On 15 June 2018, Nielsen was sentenced to one month in jail in Monaco for hitting a woman and possessing cocaine.

On 22 October 2018, he was arrested on Strøget in Central Copenhagen and charged with threats. This led to him being sacked by Lyngby Boldklub.

On 25 December 2018, Nielsen was seriously injured in the right arm, when three people entered his flat in the Sydhavnen District of Copenhagen and shot him with a shotgun.

Career statistics

Club

1 Including Polish SuperCup.

Honours

Club

FC Nordsjælland
 Danish Cup: 2009–10, 2010–11

Lech Poznań
 Polish SuperCup: 2016

References

External links
 Nicki Bille DBU 
 Danish Superliga statistics 
 Serie A statistics 
 
 Boldklubben Frem profile 
 
 

1988 births
Living people
Footballers from Copenhagen
Danish men's footballers
Denmark international footballers
Denmark under-21 international footballers
Denmark youth international footballers
Association football forwards
Danish Superliga players
Danish 1st Division players
Boldklubben Frem players
FC Nordsjælland players
Serie A players
Reggina 1914 players
A.S.D. Martina Calcio 1947 players
S.S.D. Lucchese 1905 players
La Liga players
Segunda División players
Villarreal CF B players
Villarreal CF players
Elche CF players
Rayo Vallecano players
Eliteserien players
Rosenborg BK players
Ligue 1 players
Thonon Evian Grand Genève F.C. players
Danish expatriate men's footballers
Lech Poznań players
Ekstraklasa players
Panionios F.C. players
Super League Greece players
Lyngby Boldklub players
Expatriate footballers in Italy
Expatriate footballers in Spain
Expatriate footballers in Norway
Expatriate footballers in France
Expatriate footballers in Poland
Expatriate footballers in Greece
Danish expatriate sportspeople in Norway
Danish expatriate sportspeople in Spain
Danish expatriate sportspeople in France
Danish expatriate sportspeople in Italy
Danish expatriate sportspeople in Poland
Danish expatriate sportspeople in Greece
Ishøj IF players